La Bande à Renaud is a series of two tribute albums to French singer Renaud, consisting of songs of his performed by various other artists. The albums were released in June and October 2014, respectively.

La Bande à Renaud

The initial album was released on Mercury / Universal Music containing 14 songs interpreted by 15 artists. The musical project was supervised by Renaud himself, assisted by Dominique Blanc-Francard and Alain Lanty. It reached the top of SNEP, the official French Albums Chart in its first week of release.

There were two official released singles from the single. The track "Mistral gagnant" was a major release single that appeared in the SNEP French Singles Chart and in Ultratop Belgian (Wallonia) Charts. Another official single was the collective singing "Dès que le vent soufflera". It charted in France and appeared in Belgium's Ultratipchart. Many other tracks appeared briefly in the SNEP charts.

The album shows photos of artists photographed by Barbara d'Alessandri wearing a red bandana, Renaud's signature paraphernalia. The album cover also shows a big "R" logo made of a red bandana.

Track list

La Band à Renaud Volume 2

After the great success of the initial album, a second album was released on 27 October 2014 containing 15 more tracks by 16 artists.

Track list

Charts
La Bande à Renaud

La Bande à Renaud Volume 2

Charting singles from the album
La Bande à Renaud

References

External links
Official website

2014 compilation albums
Tribute albums